USA Softball (formerly the Amateur Softball Association (ASA) and ASA/USA Softball) is the governing body for the United States national softball team. It is a member of the sport's international governing body, the World Baseball Softball Confederation (WBSC). In addition, it oversees more than 150,000 amateur teams nationwide. It is a 501(c)(3) non-profit organization.

History
USA Softball was founded in 1933 as the Amateur Softball Association (ASA) with a tournament held in Chicago that was organized by Leo Fischer and Michael J. Pauley. The following year, the 1934 National Recreation Congress recognized the ASA. Shortly afterward, the ASA was located in Newark, New Jersey. A world amateur softball tournament was held by the ASA at Chicago's Soldier Field on September 7, 1939. The ASA relocated to its new headquarters in Oklahoma City on January 1, 1966.

The ASA sponsored the highest level of college softball competition between the disbandment of the Association for Intercollegiate Athletics for Women in 1982 until the NCAA started sanctioning the sport in 1985. The University of South Florida won the National Championship in both years under the ASA.

On June 30, 2016, the Amateur Softball Association of ASA/USA Softball announced that it would be changing its organizational and trade name to "USA Softball," effective on January 1, 2017, along with a new logo.

Since 2005, the organization has run the World Cup of Softball. The USA Softball Hall of Fame Complex also hosts the NCAA Women's College World Series and the Big 12 Conference softball championship.

Team USA
In 1978, the United States Olympic Committee named USA Softball the national governing body of softball in the United States. Due to this designation, USA Softball is responsible for training, equipping, and promoting the six USA softball national teams that compete in events such as the Olympics, Pan American Games, World Championships and other international and domestic events. In 1996, the USA softball women's national team became the first American softball team to compete in the Olympics. Team USA has 15 players and 3 replacement players currently on roster. 

USA Softball registers over 120,000 softball teams adding up to about 2 million players. USA Softball is also a not-for-profit organization, which means every dollar generated by the organization goes back into improving and furthering the sport. Team USA's sole purpose is to better softball for the future and give people of all ages the opportunity to continue the game they love.

Amateur programs
The USA softball youth program began in 1974. Over 80,000 teams, 1.3 million players, and 300,000 coaches participate in USA Softball's youth division on an annual basis.

The USA Softball adult program began in 1934. With over 170,000 teams, 2.5 million players, and 500,000 coaches involved on an annual basis, the adult program is the largest USA Softball program. USA Softball provides programs of competition for adults including fast pitch, slow pitch and modified pitch for men and women.

National Softball Hall of Fame and museum
The National Softball Hall of Fame was dedicated May 26, 1973, in Oklahoma City. It has 337 members with 125 deceased, including players, managers, umpires, and other suitable individuals.

Rule book
USA Softball publishes an updated rule book for softball each year which is widely used by adult and youth recreational leagues in the United States and abroad. The USA Softball rules were also used for the softball competition when it was an Olympic sport between 1996 and 2008. The most recent Olympics to feature softball, in 2021, used the virtually identical WBSC ruleset.

References

External links
 

 
Softball
Sports in Oklahoma City
Sports in Newark, New Jersey
Softball organizations
Sports organizations established in 1933
Organizations based in Oklahoma City
501(c)(3) organizations
Softball in the United States